Cuéntame un cuento ('Tell me a story') is the third album published by the Spanish rock band Celtas Cortos. It was published in 1991 by the DRO and marked the point at which the band reached a mass audience. It sold over 500,000 copies.

The album contains songs such as "20 de abril" and the album's title track, which helped the band win the Ondas Award for the revelation group of 1991.

Track list 
El ritmo del mar
Trágame tierra
¡¡Ya está bien!!
El alquimista loco
Si te gusta
¡¡Más kilómetros!!
20 de abril
El pelotazo
Cuéntame un cuento
Onda Caribe 10.5 (Muévete brother aquí y ahora)
Aguantando el tirón
Vals de la poltrona

Credits 
 Executive producer: Juan Ignacio Cuadrado 
 
Celtas Cortos
 Nacho Martín
 Carlos Soto
 Goyo Yeves
 Alberto García
 Oscar García
 Jesús H. Cifuentes
 César Cuenca
 Nacho Castro
 Eduardo Pérez

References

External links 
Discografía de Celtas Cortos en su web oficial
Celtas Cortos in indyrock.es
Llegar a los veinte nortecastilla.es

1991 albums
Celtas Cortos albums